Angel Morey Santiago served as Chief of Staff to Puerto Rico Governor Pedro Rosselló, from 1995 to 2001.   He also served as Rosselló's third and last Secretary of State from 1999 to 2001, appointed after Norma Burgos resigned, following her nomination as candidate for Senator-at large.

A businessman and lifelong personal friend of the Governor, he returned to the private sector after his six years stint in public service.  He is a member of Phi Sigma Alpha fraternity. f

References

Living people
New Progressive Party (Puerto Rico) politicians
Secretaries of State of Puerto Rico
Year of birth missing (living people)